Thakur Mahadeo Singh DSO (9 November 1907 – 8 July 1963) was an Indian Army general who was the first Indian Commandant of the Indian Military Academy and the first Commandant of the Joint Services Wing, the precursor to the National Defence Academy.

Early life
Singh was born to a Chauhan Rajput family with a long tradition of military service. His grandfather Darshan Singh had joined the 70th Bengal Native Infantry (which later became the 11th Rajputs) in 1859, retiring in 1893 as an honorary captain. His father Jugraj Singh served as a subedar-major with the same regiment in France during World War I.

Early career
Singh joined the Prince of Wales’ Royal Indian Military College (today the Rashtriya Indian Military College) in February 1922 and passed out with its first batch of cadets and was selected to become a King's Commissioned Indian Officer (KCIO). He then attended the Royal Military Academy Sandhurst and was commissioned a second lieutenant in the British Indian Army on 30 August 1928. As was customary, he was attached to a battalion of a regular British Army regiment, the 2nd battalion of the Royal Scots Fusiliers, for a period of one year prior to his official appointment to the Indian Army. He was formally appointed to the Indian Army as an officer with the 1st Punjab Regiment on 17 October 1929. Initially, he was posted to the 2nd battalion of the 1st Punjab Regiment, stationed at Hangu, now in Pakistan and then in the North-West Frontier Province. Among the other junior officers in the same battalion were Lieutenants Kalwant Singh and Pran Nath Thapar, both of whom would also become generals in the Indian Army. The battalion was posted to Kamptee in December 1930, shortly after Singh's promotion to lieutenant. 

On 1 October 1932, he transferred to 5/2 Punjab Regiment, stationed at Bannu. In October 1934, 5/2 Punjab was posted to Chittagong, and Singh was appointed a company quartermaster on 16 December. In November 1936, he was posted with his battalion to Secunderabad. On 27 October 1938, Singh transferred to 10/2 Punjab, and served in the Waziristan campaign.

Second World War
Deployed in Iraq following the outbreak of war, Singh subsequently fought in the North African campaign and was then selected to attend the Army Staff College at Quetta, where he remained as an instructor after passing the course, with a promotion to local lieutenant-colonel on 14 December 1942. In August 1944, he rejoined 1/2 Punjab, by then in Italy as a unit of the 10th Indian Infantry Brigade, as its second-in-command. On 22 November 1944, he was appointed the battalion's first Indian commanding officer, becoming one of the first Indian COs in the European theatre. For his leadership during the subsequent Gothic Line and spring offensives, he was decorated with the Distinguished Service Order (DSO); the award was gazetted on 13 December 1945. The award citation (which was not published) reads as follows:

Post-war career
Singh took over as the Colonel of the Regiment of the Punjab Regiment on 21 March 1950. He served as the Colonel of the regiment for over 11 years, the longest tenure till date.

Awards and decorations

Dates of rank

Notes

References

1907 births
1963 deaths
British Indian Army officers
Companions of the Distinguished Service Order
Indian Companions of the Distinguished Service Order
Indian Army personnel of World War II
Indian generals
Indian Army personnel
Graduates of the Royal Military Academy Sandhurst
Rashtriya Indian Military College alumni
Commandants of the National Defence Academy
Commandants of Indian Military Academy